The Moon Jumpers is a 1959 picture book written by Janice May Udry and illustrated by Maurice Sendak. The book tells the story of some children playing at night in the summer. The book was a recipient of a 1960 Caldecott Honor for its illustrations.

References

1959 children's books
American picture books
Caldecott Honor-winning works